Tata-tonga (Mongolian script:) was a 13th-century Uyghur scribe captured by Genghis Khan from the Naimans and involved in bringing and adapting the Old Uyghur alphabet to the Mongolian Plateau in the form of the Mongolian script (Mongol bichig or hudum bichig). After his capture, he was invited to teach the Old Uyghur alphabet to members of the court, including the Khan's sons.

The Uyghur script was used until 1946, when Cyrillic script was introduced to replace it. It is still used mainly in Inner Mongolia, China. In present-day Mongolia, Cyrillic is the official script for the Mongolian language and the traditional script is referred to as the old Mongol script. Today, an estimated six million Mongol people in China can still read the traditional Mongolian script.

The Manchu alphabet was derived since the very end of the 16th century from this Mongolian script.

References

Tanguts
Writing systems
History of Mongolia